Club Sonderauflage is a vinyl LP which consists of a compilation of Black Sabbath songs released in 2006 by Earmark Records.

Track listing
All titles written by Tony Iommi/Bill Ward/Geezer Butler/Ozzy Osbourne except "Evil Woman, Don't Play Your Games With Me" by L. Weigand/R.Weigand/Waggoner

Side 1

 "War Pigs" (7:56)
 "Evil Woman, Don't Play Your Games with Me" (3:21)
 "Black Sabbath" (6:17)

Side 2

 "Paranoid" (2:49)
 "Sleeping Village" (3:47)
 "Iron Man" (5:56)
 "Rat Salad" (2:30)

References 

Black Sabbath compilation albums
2006 compilation albums